Brachylomia discinigra is a moth of the family Noctuidae first described by Francis Walker in 1856. It is found from New Brunswick to British Columbia and adjacent parts of the United States.

The wingspan is about 31 mm, the species is nocturnal and is active in the late summer to early fall across its habitat range.

External links
Bug Guide
Images
Pacific Northwest Moths

Brachylomia
Moths of North America
Moths described in 1856